"The Pretty Things Are Going to Hell" is a song written by David Bowie and Reeves Gabrels for the album Hours in 1999. The first single release from the album in Australia and Japan, while the rest of the world got "Thursday's Child" as their first single. The first appearance of the song was on the soundtrack of the film Stigmata in 1999. It charted and peaked at No. 30 in Japan. The song's title takes influence from the song "Your Pretty Face Is Going to Hell" by The Stooges from their album Raw Power produced by Bowie himself.

The music video for "The Pretty Things Are Going to Hell" exists, but officially is unreleased. In it, Bowie encounters four of his "past selves" (The Man Who Sold the World, Ziggy Stardust, The Thin White Duke and Pierrot) as played by life-sized, mannequin-like puppets. In 2013, Bowie resurrected the two latter puppets in his homemade video for James Murphy's remix of "Love Is Lost" from the album The Next Day.

Track listing

CD: Virgin / 7243 8 96293 2 3 (Australia) 
 "The Pretty Things Are Going to Hell" – 4:40
 "The Pretty Things Are Going to Hell (edit)" – 3:59
 "We Shall Go to Town" – 3:56
 "1917" – 3:27

CD: Virgin / DPRO-14338 (US)
 "The Pretty Things Are Going to Hell (edit)" – 3:59
 "The Pretty Things Are Going to Hell (Call out hook #1)" – 0:11
 "The Pretty Things Are Going to Hell (Call out hook #1)" – 0:11
 "Thursday's Child (Radio edit)" – 4:25
 "Thursday's Child (Call out hook #1)" – 0:12
 "Thursday's Child (Call out hook #2)" – 0:12

Production credits
Producers
David Bowie
Reeves Gabrels

Musicians
David Bowie - vocals, synthesizer, tambourine
Reeves Gabrels - electric guitar
Mark Plati - bass guitar
Mike Levesque - drums

Live versions
 A live version recorded at Kit Kat Klub, New York City, 19 November 1999 was released on the single "Seven" in July 2000.

Other releases
 It was released in a slightly different mix on the soundtrack of the film Stigmata in 1999. This version was also released on the single "Survive".
 The edited version, "Stigmata film version" and "Stigmata film only version" was released on the bonus disc that followed the 2004 reissue of Hours.
 In April 2000, a remixable version of the song was released to the Web as a Beatnik eMix.

References

1999 singles
David Bowie songs
Songs written by David Bowie
Songs written by Reeves Gabrels
Song recordings produced by David Bowie
1999 songs
Virgin Records singles